This is a list of the mammal species recorded in Namibia. Of the mammal species in Namibia, one is critically endangered, four are endangered, five are vulnerable, and seven are near threatened.

The following tags are used to highlight each species' conservation status as assessed by the International Union for Conservation of Nature:

Some species were assessed using an earlier set of criteria. Species assessed using this system have the following instead of near threatened and least concern categories:

Order: Afrosoricida (tenrecs and golden moles) 

The order Afrosoricida contains the golden moles of southern Africa and the tenrecs of Madagascar and Africa, two families of small mammals that were traditionally part of the order Insectivora.

Family: Chrysochloridae
Subfamily: Chrysochlorinae
Genus: Eremitalpa
 Grant's golden mole, Eremitalpa granti NT

Order: Macroscelidea (elephant shrews) 

Often called sengis, the elephant shrews or jumping shrews are native to southern Africa. Their common English name derives from their elongated flexible snout and their resemblance to the true shrews.

Family: Macroscelididae (elephant shrews)
Genus: Elephantulus
 Short-snouted elephant shrew, Elephantulus brachyrhynchus LC
 Bushveld elephant shrew, Elephantulus intufi LC
 Western rock elephant shrew, Elephantulus rupestris LC
Genus: Macroscelides
 Namib round-eared elephant shrew, Macroscelides flavicaudatus
 Short-eared elephant shrew, Macroscelides proboscideus LC
 Etendeka round-eared elephant shrew Macroscelides micus
Genus: Petrodromus
 Four-toed elephant shrew, Petrodromus tetradactylus LC

Order: Tubulidentata (aardvarks) 

The order Tubulidentata consists of a single species, the aardvark. Tubulidentata are characterised by their teeth which lack a pulp cavity and form thin tubes which are continuously worn down and replaced.

Family: Orycteropodidae
Genus: Orycteropus
 Aardvark, O. afer

Order: Hyracoidea (hyraxes) 

The hyraxes are any of four species of fairly small, thickset, herbivorous mammals in the order Hyracoidea. About the size of a domestic cat they are well-furred, with rounded bodies and a stumpy tail. They are native to Africa and the Middle East.

Family: Procaviidae (hyraxes)
Genus: Procavia
 Cape hyrax, P. capensis

Order: Proboscidea (elephants) 

The elephants comprise three living species and are the largest living land animals.
Family: Elephantidae (elephants)
Genus: Loxodonta
African bush elephant, L. africana

Order: Primates 

The order Primates contains humans and their closest relatives: lemurs, lorisoids, tarsiers, monkeys, and apes.

Suborder: Strepsirrhini
Infraorder: Lemuriformes
Superfamily: Lorisoidea
Family: Galagidae
Genus: Galago
 Mohol bushbaby, Galago moholi LR/lc
Suborder: Haplorhini
Infraorder: Simiiformes
Parvorder: Catarrhini
Superfamily: Cercopithecoidea
Family: Cercopithecidae (Old World monkeys)
Genus: Chlorocebus
 Malbrouck, Chlorocebus cynosuros LR/lc
 Vervet monkey, Chlorocebus pygerythrus LR/lc
Genus: Papio
 Chacma baboon, Papio ursinus LR/lc

Order: Rodentia (rodents) 

Rodents make up the largest order of mammals, with over 40% of mammalian species. They have two incisors in the upper and lower jaw which grow continually and must be kept short by gnawing. Most rodents are small though the capybara can weigh up to 45 kg (100 lb).

Suborder: Hystricognathi
Family: Bathyergidae
Genus: Bathyergus
 Namaqua dune mole-rat, Bathyergus janetta LC
Genus: Cryptomys
 Bocage's mole-rat, Cryptomys bocagei DD
 Damaraland mole-rat, Cryptomys damarensis LC
Family: Hystricidae (Old World porcupines)
Genus: Hystrix
 Cape porcupine, Hystrix africaeaustralis LC
Family: Petromuridae
Genus: Petromus
 Dassie rat, Petromus typicus LC
Family: Thryonomyidae (cane rats)
Genus: Thryonomys
 Greater cane rat, Thryonomys swinderianus LC
Suborder: Sciurognathi
Family: Pedetidae (springhare)
Genus: Pedetes
 South African springhare, Pedetes capensis LC
Family: Sciuridae (squirrels)
Subfamily: Xerinae
Tribe: Xerini
Genus: Xerus
 South African ground squirrel, Xerus inauris LC
 Mountain ground squirrel, Xerus princeps LC
Tribe: Protoxerini
Genus: Funisciurus
 Congo rope squirrel, Funisciurus congicus LC
Genus: Paraxerus
 Smith's bush squirrel, Paraxerus cepapi LC
Family: Gliridae (dormice)
Subfamily: Graphiurinae
Genus: Graphiurus
 Small-eared dormouse, Graphiurus microtis LC
 Stone dormouse, Graphiurus rupicola LC
Family: Nesomyidae
Subfamily: Petromyscinae
Genus: Petromyscus
 Pygmy rock mouse, Petromyscus collinus LC
 Brukkaros pygmy rock mouse, Petromyscus monticularis LC
 Shortridge's rock mouse, Petromyscus shortridgei LC
Subfamily: Dendromurinae
Genus: Dendromus
 Gray climbing mouse, Dendromus melanotis LC
 Brants's climbing mouse, Dendromus mesomelas LC
Genus: Malacothrix
 Gerbil mouse, Malacothrix typica LC
Genus: Steatomys
 Kreb's fat mouse, Steatomys krebsii LC
 Tiny fat mouse, Steatomys parvus LC
 Fat mouse, Steatomys pratensis LC
Subfamily: Cricetomyinae
Genus: Saccostomus
 South African pouched mouse, Saccostomus campestris LC
Family: Muridae (mice, rats, voles, gerbils, hamsters, etc.)
Genus: Myotomys
 Bush vlei rat, Myotomys unisulcatus LC
Subfamily: Otomyinae
Genus: Otomys
 Large vlei rat, Otomys maximus LC
Genus: Parotomys
 Brants's whistling rat, Parotomys brantsii LC
 Littledale's whistling rat, Parotomys littledalei LC
Subfamily: Gerbillinae
Genus: Desmodillus
 Cape short-eared gerbil, Desmodillus auricularis LC
Genus: Gerbillurus
 Hairy-footed gerbil, Gerbillurus paeba LC
 Namib brush-tailed gerbil, Gerbillurus setzeri LC
 Dune hairy-footed gerbil, Gerbillurus tytonis LC
 Bushy-tailed hairy-footed gerbil, Gerbillurus vallinus LC
Genus: Tatera
 Highveld gerbil, Tatera brantsii LC
 Bushveld gerbil, Tatera leucogaster LC
Subfamily: Murinae
Genus: Aethomys
 Red rock rat, Aethomys chrysophilus LC
 Namaqua rock rat, Aethomys namaquensis LC
Genus: Dasymys
 Angolan marsh rat, Dasymys nudipes NT
Genus: Lemniscomys
 Single-striped grass mouse, Lemniscomys rosalia LC
Genus: Mastomys
 Southern multimammate mouse, Mastomys coucha LC
 Natal multimammate mouse, Mastomys natalensis LC
 Shortridge's multimammate mouse, Mastomys shortridgei LC
Genus: Mus
 Desert pygmy mouse, Mus indutus LC
 African pygmy mouse, Mus minutoides LC
 Setzer's pygmy mouse, Mus setzeri LC
Genus: Pelomys
 Creek groove-toothed swamp rat, Pelomys fallax LC
Genus: Rhabdomys
 Four-striped grass mouse, Rhabdomys pumilio LC
Genus: Thallomys
 Black-tailed tree rat, Thallomys nigricauda LC
 Acacia rat, Thallomys paedulcus LC
Genus: Zelotomys
 Woosnam's broad-headed mouse, Zelotomys woosnami LC

Order: Lagomorpha (lagomorphs) 

The lagomorphs comprise two families, Leporidae (hares and rabbits), and Ochotonidae (pikas). Though they can resemble rodents, and were classified as a superfamily in that order until the early 20th century, they have since been considered a separate order. They differ from rodents in a number of physical characteristics, such as having four incisors in the upper jaw rather than two.

Family: Leporidae (rabbits, hares)
Genus: Pronolagus
 Jameson's red rock hare, Pronolagus randensis LR/lc
 Smith's red rock hare, Pronolagus rupestris LR/lc
Genus: Lepus
 Cape hare, Lepus capensis LR/lc
 African savanna hare, Lepus microtis LR/lc
 Scrub hare, Lepus saxatilis LR/lc

Order: Erinaceomorpha (hedgehogs and gymnures) 

The order Erinaceomorpha contains a single family, Erinaceidae, which comprises the hedgehogs and gymnures. The hedgehogs are easily recognised by their spines while gymnures look more like large rats.

Family: Erinaceidae (hedgehogs)
Subfamily: Erinaceinae
Genus: Atelerix
 Southern African hedgehog, Atelerix frontalis LR/lc

Order: Soricomorpha (shrews, moles, and solenodons) 

The "shrew-forms" are insectivorous mammals. The shrews and solenodons closely resemble mice while the moles are stout-bodied burrowers.

Family: Soricidae (shrews)
Subfamily: Crocidurinae
Genus: Crocidura
 Reddish-gray musk shrew, Crocidura cyanea LC
 Bicolored musk shrew, Crocidura fuscomurina LC
 Lesser red musk shrew, Crocidura hirta LC
 Swamp musk shrew, Crocidura mariquensis LC
 African giant shrew, Crocidura olivieri LC
Genus: Suncus
 Greater dwarf shrew, Suncus lixus LC

Order: Chiroptera (bats) 

The bats' most distinguishing feature is that their forelimbs are developed as wings, making them the only mammals capable of flight. Bat species account for about 20% of all mammals.

Family: Pteropodidae (flying foxes, Old World fruit bats)
Subfamily: Pteropodinae
Genus: Eidolon
 Straw-coloured fruit bat, Eidolon helvum LC
Genus: Epomophorus
 Angolan epauletted fruit bat, Epomophorus angolensis NT
 Peters's epauletted fruit bat, Epomophorus crypturus LC
Family: Vespertilionidae
Subfamily: Myotinae
Genus: Cistugo
 Angolan hairy bat, Cistugo seabrai NT
Subfamily: Vespertilioninae
Genus: Eptesicus
 Long-tailed house bat, Eptesicus hottentotus LC
Genus: Glauconycteris
 Butterfly bat, Glauconycteris variegata LC
Genus: Laephotis
 Botswanan long-eared bat, Laephotis botswanae LC
 Namib long-eared bat, Laephotis namibensis LC
Genus: Neoromicia
 Cape serotine, Neoromicia capensis LC
 Banana pipistrelle, Neoromicia nanus LC
 Somali serotine, Neoromicia somalicus LC
 Zulu serotine, Neoromicia zuluensis LC
Genus: Nycticeinops
 Schlieffen's bat, Nycticeinops schlieffeni LC
Genus: Pipistrellus
 Rusty pipistrelle, Pipistrellus rusticus LC
Genus: Scotophilus
 African yellow bat, Scotophilus dinganii LC
 White-bellied yellow bat, Scotophilus leucogaster LC
 Greenish yellow bat, Scotophilus viridis LC
Subfamily: Miniopterinae
Genus: Miniopterus
 Greater long-fingered bat, Miniopterus inflatus LC
 Natal long-fingered bat, Miniopterus natalensis NT
Family: Molossidae
Genus: Chaerephon
 Nigerian free-tailed bat, Chaerephon nigeriae LC
Genus: Mops
 Angolan free-tailed bat, Mops condylurus LC
 Midas free-tailed bat, Mops midas LC
Genus: Sauromys
 Roberts's flat-headed bat, Sauromys petrophilus LC
Genus: Tadarida
 Egyptian free-tailed bat, Tadarida aegyptiaca LC
Family: Emballonuridae
Genus: Taphozous
 Mauritian tomb bat, Taphozous mauritianus LC
Family: Nycteridae
Genus: Nycteris
 Hairy slit-faced bat, Nycteris hispida LC
 Egyptian slit-faced bat, Nycteris thebaica LC
Family: Rhinolophidae
Subfamily: Rhinolophinae
Genus: Rhinolophus
 Geoffroy's horseshoe bat, Rhinolophus clivosus LC
 Darling's horseshoe bat, Rhinolophus darlingi LC
 Dent's horseshoe bat, Rhinolophus denti DD
 Rüppell's horseshoe bat, Rhinolophus fumigatus LC
Subfamily: Hipposiderinae
Genus: Hipposideros
 Sundevall's roundleaf bat, Hipposideros caffer LC
 Commerson's roundleaf bat, Hipposideros marungensis NT

Order: Pholidota (pangolins) 

The order Pholidota comprises the eight species of pangolin. Pangolins are anteaters and have the powerful claws, elongated snout and long tongue seen in the other unrelated anteater species.

Family: Manidae
Genus: Manis
 Ground pangolin, Manis temminckii LR/nt

Order: Cetacea (whales) 

The order Cetacea includes whales, dolphins and porpoises. They are the mammals most fully adapted to aquatic life with a spindle-shaped nearly hairless body, protected by a thick layer of blubber, and forelimbs and tail modified to provide propulsion underwater.

Suborder: Mysticeti
Family: Balaenopteridae
Subfamily: Balaenopterinae
Genus: Balaenoptera
 Southern blue whale, Balaenoptera musculus intermedia EN
 Southern fin whale, Balaenoptera physalus quoyi EN
 Southern sei whale, Balaenoptera borealis schlegelii EN
 Bryde's whale, Balaenoptera edeni DD
 Common minke whale, Balaenoptera acutorostrata DD
 Antarctic minke whale, Balaenoptera bonaerensis DD
Genus: Megaptera
 Humpback whale, Megaptera novaeangliae LC
Family: Cetotheriidae
Subfamily: Neobalaeninae
Genus: Caperea
 Pygmy right whale Caperea marginata DD
Family: Balaenidae
Genus: Eubalaena
 Southern right whale, Eubalaena australis  LC (still in small numbers in Namibia)
Suborder: Odontoceti
Family: Physeteridae
Genus: Physeter
 Sperm whale, Physeter catodon VU
Superfamily: Platanistoidea
Family: Kogiidae
Genus: Kogia
 Pygmy sperm whale, Kogia breviceps LR/lc
 Dwarf sperm whale, Kogia sima LR/lc
Family: Ziphidae
Genus: Ziphius
 Cuvier's beaked whale, Ziphius cavirostris DD
Subfamily: Hyperoodontinae
Genus: Mesoplodon
 Blainville's beaked whale, Mesoplodon densirostris DD
 Gray's beaked whale, Mesoplodon grayi DD
 Hector's beaked whale, Mesoplodon hectori DD
 Strap-toothed whale, Mesoplodon layardii DD
Family: Delphinidae (marine dolphins)
Genus: Cephalorhynchus
 Heaviside's dolphin, Cephalorhynchus heavisidii DD
Genus: Steno
 Rough-toothed dolphin, Steno bredanensis DD
Genus: Tursiops
 Common bottlenose dolphin, Tursiops truncatus DD
Genus: Stenella
 Pantropical spotted dolphin, Stenella attenuata DD
 Atlantic spotted dolphin, Stenella frontalis DD
 Striped dolphin, Stenella coeruleoalba DD
 Spinner dolphin, Stenella longirostris LR/cd
Genus: Lagenodelphis
 Fraser's dolphin, Lagenodelphis hosei DD
Genus: Lissodelphis
 Southern right whale dolphin, Lissodelphis peronii DD
Genus: Sagmatias
 Dusky dolphin, Sagmatias obscurus DD
Genus: Grampus
 Risso's dolphin, Grampus griseus DD
Genus: Feresa
 Pygmy killer whale, Feresa attenuata DD
Genus: Pseudorca
 False killer whale, Pseudorca crassidens DD
Genus: Orcinus
 Orca, Orcinus orca LR/cd
Genus: Globicephala
 Long-finned pilot whale, Globicephala melas DD
 Short-finned pilot whale, Globicephala macrorhyncus DD
Genus: Peponocephala
 Melon-headed whale, Peponocephala electra DD

Order: Carnivora (carnivorans) 

There are over 260 species of carnivorans, the majority of which feed primarily on meat. They have a characteristic skull shape and dentition.
Suborder: Feliformia
Family: Felidae (cats)
Subfamily: Felinae
Genus: Acinonyx
Cheetah, A. jubatus 
 Southeast African cheetah, A. j. jubatus
Genus: Caracal
 Caracal, C. caracal LC
Genus: Felis
 Black-footed cat, F. nigripes VU
African wildcat, F. lybica 
Genus: Leptailurus
 Serval, L. serval LC
Subfamily: Pantherinae
Genus: Panthera
 Lion, P. leo VU
 P. l. melanochaita
 Leopard, P. pardus NT
 African leopard, P. p. pardus
Family: Viverridae
Subfamily: Viverrinae
Genus: Civettictis
 African civet, C. civetta LC
Genus: Genetta
 Common genet, G. genetta LC
 Rusty-spotted genet, G. maculata LC
Family: Herpestidae (mongooses)
Genus: Cynictis
 Yellow mongoose, C. penicillata LC
Genus: Helogale
 Common dwarf mongoose, H. parvula LC
Genus: Herpestes
 Angolan slender mongoose, H. flavescens LC
Cape gray mongoose, H. pulverulentus LC
 Common slender mongoose, H. sanguineus LC
Genus: Ichneumia
 White-tailed mongoose, I. albicauda LC
Genus: Mungos
 Banded mongoose, M. mungo LC
Genus: Paracynictis
 Selous' mongoose, P. selousi LC
Genus: Suricata
 Meerkat, S. suricatta LC
Family: Hyaenidae (hyaenas)
Genus: Crocuta
 Spotted hyena, C. crocuta LC
Genus: Parahyaena
 Brown hyena, P. brunnea NT
Genus: Proteles
 Aardwolf, P. cristatus LC
Suborder: Caniformia
Family: Canidae (dogs, foxes)
Genus: Vulpes
 Cape fox, V. chama LC
Genus: Lupulella
 Side-striped jackal, L. adusta  
 Black-backed jackal, L. mesomelas  
Genus: Otocyon
 Bat-eared fox, O. megalotis LC
Genus: Lycaon
 African wild dog, L. pictus EN
Family: Mustelidae (mustelids)
Genus: Ictonyx
 Striped polecat, I. striatus LC
Genus: Poecilogale
 African striped weasel, P. albinucha LC
Genus: Mellivora
Honey badger, M. capensis 
Genus: Lutra
 Speckle-throated otter, L. maculicollis LC
Genus: Aonyx
 African clawless otter, A. capensis LC
Family: Otariidae (eared seals, sealions)
Genus: Arctocephalus
 Cape fur seal, A. pusillus LC
Family: Phocidae (earless seals)
Genus: Mirounga
 Southern elephant seal, M. leonina LC

Order: Perissodactyla (odd-toed ungulates) 

The odd-toed ungulates are browsing and grazing mammals. They are usually large to very large, and have relatively simple stomachs and a large middle toe.

Family: Equidae (horses etc.)
Genus: Equus
Plains zebra, E. quagga 
Burchell's zebra, E. q. burchellii 
Chapman's zebra, E. q. chapmani 
Mountain zebra, E. zebra 
Hartmann's mountain zebra, E. z. hartmannae 
Family: Rhinocerotidae
Genus: Ceratotherium
White rhinoceros, C. simum 
Southern white rhinoceros, C. s. simum 
Genus: Diceros
Black rhinoceros, D. bicornis 
Chobe black rhinoceros, D. b. chobiensis 
Southern black rhinoceros, D. b. bicornis 
South-western black rhinoceros, D. b. occidentalis

Order: Artiodactyla (even-toed ungulates) 

The even-toed ungulates are ungulates whose weight is borne about equally by the third and fourth toes, rather than mostly or entirely by the third as in perissodactyls. There are about 220 artiodactyl species, including many that are of great economic importance to humans.

Family: Suidae (pigs)
Subfamily: Phacochoerinae
Genus: Phacochoerus
 Common warthog, Phacochoerus africanus LR/lc
Subfamily: Suinae
Genus: Potamochoerus
 Bushpig, Potamochoerus larvatus LR/lc
Family: Hippopotamidae (hippopotamuses)
Genus: Hippopotamus
 Hippopotamus, Hippopotamus amphibius VU
Family: Giraffidae (giraffe, okapi)
Genus: Giraffa
 Giraffe, Giraffa camelopardalis VU
Family: Bovidae (cattle, antelope, sheep, goats)
Subfamily: Alcelaphinae
Genus: Alcelaphus
 Hartebeest, Alcelaphus buselaphus LR/cd
Genus: Connochaetes
 Blue wildebeest, Connochaetes taurinus LR/cd
Genus: Damaliscus
 Topi, Damaliscus lunatus LR/cd
Subfamily: Antilopinae
Genus: Antidorcas
 Springbok antelope, Antidorcas marsupialis LR/cd
Genus: Madoqua
 Kirk's dik-dik, Madoqua kirkii LR/lc
Genus: Oreotragus
 Klipspringer, Oreotragus oreotragus LR/cd
Genus: Raphicerus
 Steenbok, Raphicerus campestris LR/lc
Subfamily: Bovinae
Genus: Syncerus
 African buffalo, Syncerus caffer LR/cd
Genus: Tragelaphus
 Nyala, T. angasii LC introduced
 Common eland, Tragelaphus oryx LR/cd
 Bushbuck, Tragelaphus scriptus LR/lc
 Sitatunga, Tragelaphus spekii LR/nt
 Greater kudu, Tragelaphus strepsiceros LR/cd
Subfamily: Cephalophinae
Genus: Sylvicapra
 Common duiker, Sylvicapra grimmia LR/lc
Subfamily: Hippotraginae
Genus: Hippotragus
 Roan antelope, Hippotragus equinus LR/cd
 Sable antelope, Hippotragus niger LR/cd
Genus: Oryx
 Gemsbok, Oryx gazella LR/cd
Subfamily: Aepycerotinae
Genus: Aepyceros
 Impala, Aepyceros melampus LR/cd
Subfamily: Reduncinae
Genus: Kobus
 Waterbuck, Kobus ellipsiprymnus LR/cd
 Lechwe, Kobus leche LR/cd
 Puku, Kobus vardonii LR/cd
Genus: Redunca
 Southern reedbuck, Redunca arundinum LR/cd

Notes

See also
Wildlife of Namibia
List of chordate orders
Lists of mammals by region
List of prehistoric mammals
Mammal classification
List of mammals described in the 2000s

References

External links
 Mammal pages on the Namibia Biodiversity Database

Namibia
Namibia
Mammals